Delhi Reservoir was a small reservoir located northwest of Delhi in Delaware County, New York. Steele Brook flowed through Delhi Reservoir.

See also
 List of lakes in New York

References 

Lakes of New York (state)
Lakes of Delaware County, New York
Reservoirs in Delaware County, New York